Graeme Ortlieb (born 23 March 1970) is a South African cricketer. He played in one first-class match for Border in 1995/96.

See also
 List of Border representative cricketers

References

External links
 

1970 births
Living people
South African cricketers
Border cricketers
Cricketers from Windhoek